Maid to Order is a 1987 American comedy/fantasy film. It is a variation on the Cinderella formula, where the fairy godmother is not the means to a better life for the heroine, but rather the nemesis. Rather than doing so out of malice, though, the fairy godmother hopes to teach the heroine that life has more of importance than financial security.

Plot
Jessica "Jessie" Montgomery (Ally Sheedy) is a bratty, hard-partying rich girl in her mid-20s. Jessie's self-indulgent lifestyle (along with a lack of respect for anything or anybody, even herself) has been wearing thin on her father Charles (Tom Skerritt), a widowed philanthropist. When Jessie's boyfriend Brent (Jason Beghe) breaks up with her, out of frustration with her immaturity and utter lack of values, she could not care less. Then, Jessie is arrested for drug possession and DWI with a suspended license (she also attempts to bribe her arresting officers). Charles blames himself for his daughter's downward spiral: Jessie's mother died only a few years after the girl was born; instead of laying down the law, he spoiled Jessie rotten...often leaving her in the care of his valet Woodrow (Theodore Wilson) and other family retainers. Now, hearing that his daughter has been busted and her car impounded, he wishes aloud (ostensibly to Woodrow, but also to himself) that he had never had a daughter. Outside, a star falls. Jessie's identity is magically erased, leaving her fully clothed, but with no resources or possessions, and no family or friends.

Enter Stella Winston (Beverly D'Angelo), a fairy godmother who has been "assigned" to the Montgomery family. Stella pays Jessie's bail and explains what has happened as a result of Charles' wish. Being Jessie, she does not believe a word Stella says. When she walks to her father's mansion, neither he nor any of the servants recognize her; neither does Jimmy, the family dog. When Jessie breaks into the mansion, she is promptly chased out and has to flee when the cops show up.

Wandering the streets, Jessie trips over some girls with whom she recently partied. They insist they have never seen Jessie before in their lives, and shove her away. She once again encounters Stella...who spells out all of Jessie's faults and suggests the girl find a job to provide for herself. Having never worked a day in her life (she dropped out of junior college after "six years"), Jessie nonetheless succeeds in finding employment as a live-in maid for an eccentric Malibu family: Stan Starkey (Dick Shawn), his wife Georgette (Valerie Perrine), and their daughter Brie (Rain Phoenix). A few years ago, the Starkeys won several million dollars in the lottery; they now aspire to break into the music industry as talent agents.

Gradually, Jessie bonds with the Starkeys' other retainers: cook Audrey (Merry Clayton), a failed singer; fellow maid Maria (Begoña Plaza); and chauffeur Nick (Michael Ontkean), an aspiring songwriter. Jessie learns the true meaning of friendship, hard work, and self-respect...while falling in love with Nick. When she helps Nick and Audrey break into the music business, Jessie's old life is returned to her; her dad and everyone else recognize her again. However, being a better and more mature person, Jessie continues her relationship with Nick; the ending implies that they ultimately get married.

Cast
 Ally Sheedy – Jessie Montgomery
 Beverly D'Angelo – Stella Winston
 Michael Ontkean – Nick McGuire
 Valerie Perrine – Georgette Starkey
 Dick Shawn – Stan Starkey
 Tom Skerritt – Charles Montgomery
 Merry Clayton – Audrey James
 Begoña Plaza – Maria
 Rain Phoenix – Brie Starkey (as Rainbow Phoenix)
 Theodore Wilson - Woodrow
 Jason Beghe - Brent
 Katey Sagal - Louise
 Victoria Catlin - Alicia Nolin
 Khandi Alexander - Hooker in Jail
 Henry Woolf - Jailer
Robert Jaffe - Miles
 George Chala Sr - Gas Station owner (Uncredited)

Reception
Reviews were negative. Roger Ebert of the Chicago Sun-Times "found it too easy to anticipate most of the big moments and too hard to believe that Sheedy was really a spoiled, mean-spirited rich bitch." Janet Maslin in The New York Times praised Sheedy, saying her "petulant manner and her air of faint distaste for her surroundings are just right for this role. And she shows herself to be an able physical comedienne." FloridaGator80 writes "despite its shortcomings, Maid to Order leaves you in a good mood."

Maid To Order holds a 42% rating on Rotten Tomatoes based on 12 reviews.

Filming locations
Jessie's father's mansion is located at 365 S Hudson Street, Los Angeles, California. The Starkey mansion, where Jessie worked, is located at 32596 Pacific Coast Hwy, Malibu, California. The gas station where Jessie kicks the vending machine was located on Sunset and Swathmore in the Pacific Palisades.

Availability
The movie was released on VHS by International Video Entertainment in 1988 and again in 1991 by Avid Home Entertainment. In 2002, Artisan Entertainment released the film on DVD without bonus features and was presented only in full screen.

Soundtrack
 "Spirit in the Sky", performed by Doctor and the Medics, music and lyrics by Norman Greenbaum
 "I'm On My Own", performed by Craig Thomas, music and lyrics by Ralph Jones and Claudette Raiche
 "Clean Up Woman", performed by Bekka Bramlett, music and lyrics by Clarence Reid and Willie Clark
 "I Can Still Shine", performed by Merry Clayton, music and lyrics by Ashford and Simpson
 "It's in His Kiss", performed by Merry Clayton, music and lyrics by Rudy Clark
 "976-Self Service", music by Ralph Jones and Claudette Raiche
 "Fernando the Champ", music and lyrics by Rudy Regaiado

References

External links
 
 
 
 
 

1987 films
1980s fantasy comedy films
1987 independent films
American fantasy comedy films
American independent films
Films scored by Georges Delerue
1987 comedy films
Films directed by Amy Holden Jones
Films with screenplays by Amy Holden Jones
1980s English-language films
1980s American films